The 1923 South Dakota State Jackrabbits football team was an American football team that represented South Dakota State College in the North Central Conference (NCC) during the 1923 college football season. In its fifth season under head coach Charles A. West, the team compiled a 2–5 record, finished fourth in the NCC, and outscored opponents by a total of 94 to 78.

Schedule

References

South Dakota State
South Dakota State Jackrabbits football seasons
South Dakota State Jackrabbits football